Mr. Gentle Mr. Cool, subtitled A Tribute to Duke Ellington, is an album by saxophonist David "Fathead" Newman recorded in 1994 and released on Herbie Mann's Kokopelli label.

Reception

In his review for AllMusic, Scott Yanow states "David "Fathead" Newman is in excellent form on this tasteful program of 11 Duke Ellington compositions. ... The music contains few real surprises (other than the utilization of both bass and piccolo bass) but swings nicely and has fine melodic solos".

Track listing 
All compositions by Duke Ellington except where noted
 "Don't Get Around Much Anymore" (Ellington, Bob Russell) – 4:41
 "Prelude to a Kiss" (Ellington, Irving Gordon, Irving Mills) – 5:39
 "Mr. Gentle and Mr. Cool" (Ellington, Harold Baker) – 5:45
 "Almost Cried" – 6:21
 "I Let a Song Go Out of My Heart" (Ellington, Mills, Henry Nemo, John Redmond) – 5:12
 "Azure" (Ellington, Mills) – 5:39
 "What Am I Here For?" (Ellington, Frankie Laine) – 4:46
 "Happy Reunion" – 3:42
 "Come Sunday" – 2:56
 "Creole Love Call" – 5:43
 "Jeep's Blues" (Ellington, Johnny Hodges) – 5:32

Personnel 
David "Fathead" Newman – tenor saxophone, alto saxophone, flute
Jim Pugh – trombone
David Leonhardt – piano
Ron Carter – piccolo bass 
Peter Washington – bass 
Lewis Nash – drums
Bob Freedman – arranger

References 

David "Fathead" Newman albums
1994 albums
Kokopelli Records albums
Duke Ellington tribute albums